Irving is an unincorporated community in Benton County, in the U.S. state of Iowa.

History
The community was named in the 1850s for author Washington Irving.

References

Unincorporated communities in Benton County, Iowa
1850s establishments in Iowa
Unincorporated communities in Iowa